Sierpienica is a river of Poland, a tributary of the Skrwa Prawa near Sierpc.

Rivers of Poland
Rivers of Masovian Voivodeship